Ephoria ephora is a moth in the family Apatelodidae. It was described by Caspar Stoll in 1781, from a specimen from Suriname.

Original description
As Phalaena ephora, by Caspar Stoll (1781) in

References

Apatelodidae
Moths described in 1781